Thomas Vaux, 2nd Baron Vaux of Harrowden KB (25 April 1509 – October 1556), English poet, was the eldest son of Nicholas Vaux, 1st Baron Vaux and his second wife, Anne Green, daughter of Sir Thomas Green, Lord of Nortons Green, and Joan Fogge. He was educated at Cambridge University. His mother was the maternal aunt of queen consort Catherine Parr, while his wife, Elizabeth Cheney, was her paternal cousin through Catherine's father's sister, Anne Parr.

Life
In 1527, he accompanied Cardinal Wolsey on his embassy in France. Vaux privately disapproved of King Henry VIII's divorce from his first wife, Catherine of Aragon. In 1531, he took his seat in the House of Lords. In 1532, he attended Henry VIII to Calais and Boulogne and was made Knight of the Bath at the coronation of Anne Boleyn. He was Lieutenant Governor of Jersey in 1536. Schism from Rome caused him to sell his offices; he did not attend Parliament between 1534 and 1554. Instead, Vaux retired to his country seat until the accession of Mary I, when he returned to London for her coronation. Vaux was the friend of other court poets such as Sir Thomas Wyatt and Henry Howard, Earl of Surrey.

Family and issue

Thomas's father, Nicholas, had been previously married to Elizabeth FitzHugh, daughter of Henry FitzHugh, 5th Lord FitzHugh of Ravensworth Castle and Lady Alice Neville, as her second husband. From that marriage, Vaux had three older paternal half-sisters; Katherine Throckmorton; Alice Sapcote; and Anne Strange. By Elizabeth's first marriage to Sir William Parr, she was the mother of Anne Parr, the mother of Thomas' wife, Elizabeth Cheney. Elizabeth FitzHugh was also the mother to Sir Thomas Parr, thus making her the paternal grandmother of Queen Catherine Parr. After the death of Elizabeth in about 1507, his father married secondly to Anne Green, who was the older sister of Maud Green who had married Sir Thomas Parr; thus making Vaux a first cousin to queen Catherine.

On 6 May 1511, Sir Thomas, aged two, was contracted to marry Elizabeth Cheney. Thomas married Elizabeth between 25 April 1523 and 10 November 1523. They had three children.
William Vaux, 3rd Baron Vaux of Harrowden (born 1535)
Nicholas Vaux
Anne Vaux, who married Reginald Bray of Stene, nephew of Edmund Braye, 1st Baron Braye

Thomas Vaux died in October 1556. Sketches of Vaux and his wife by Holbein are held at Windsor Castle and a finished portrait of Lady Vaux at Hampton Court.

Works
Two of his poems were included in the Songes and Sonettes of Surrey (Tottel's Miscellany), published in 1557: "The assault of Cupid upon the fort where the lover's hart lay wounded, and how he was taken," and the "Dittye ... representinge the Image of Deathe," which the gravedigger in Shakespeare's Hamlet misquotes.

Thirteen pieces in the Paradise of Dainty Devices, published in 1576, are signed by him. These are reprinted in Alexander Grosart's Miscellanies of the Fuller Worthies Library (vol. iv, 1872).

See also

Canons of Elizabethan poetry

References

Sources
 

This article contains text from A General and Heraldic Dictionary of the Peerages of England, Ireland, and Scotland: Extinct, Dormant, and in Abeyance, Vol. VIII, by John Burke, 1831, now in the public domain

External links
Index entry for Thomas, Lord Vaux at Poets' Corner

1510 births
1556 deaths
16th-century English poets
Barons Vaux of Harrowden
Governors of Jersey
Knights of the Bath
Thomas
English male poets
16th-century English nobility